Rob Roy Island, native name Velaviru, is an island in the Solomon Islands located off the South East coast of Choiseul Island; it is located in Choiseul Province.

Geography
The island is covered with coconut plantation and jungle. The island is 20 km long and has a summit elevation of 150 m.

Nagosele Passage divides Rob Roy Island from Choiseul Island

References

Notes
 Rob Roy - Bird Checklists for 440 Melanesian Islands

Islands of the Solomon Islands